The Helping Hand Party was a minor political party in the Province of British Columbia, Canada, between 2011 and 2013. The party believed that "helping others unconditionally provides for a meaningful existence."

It nominated one candidate in the 2013 BC election, party leader Alan Saldanha, who ran in the Surrey-Newton riding. The party de-registered with Elections BC in July 2013.

See also
List of British Columbia political parties

References

External links
 Interview with party leader Alan Saldanha

Provincial political parties in British Columbia
Surrey, British Columbia
Political parties established in 2011
2011 establishments in British Columbia